Best of Gomo is the debut album by the Portuguese singer Gomo. It was released in 2004 in Portugal. The album spawned the two singles "Feeling Alive" and "I Wonder".

Production
This disc, which includes the singles "Santa's depression" and "Feeling Alive" is an essential disc for all who call themselves lovers of good music. Was recorded, produced and mastered by Mário Barreiros and had different interests, especially that of Pedro Oliveira (Seventh Legion) who lent his voice after more than fifteen years without recording.

Critical reception
Upon its release, the album met with favourable reviews, at Album Scores, it holds a score of 80 of 100, indicating generally favourable reviews.

Singles
"Santa's Depression"
"Feeling Alive"
"It's All Worth It"
"I Wonder"

Guest musicians
Mário Barreiros - acoustic guitar track 1 - battery range 8, 9, 10, 11:12 - lower track 11
Bruno Fiandeiro - keys range 2:05 - low band 3
Carlos Gouveia - electric guitar a full
Vasco Duarte - guitar track 6
Gonçalo Catarino - low track 1, 4, 7, 8, 9 and 10
Gonçalo Leonardo - violin and mandolin track 8
Manuel Simoes - guitar track 8
Pedro Oliveira - boice band 2

Track listing
"Feeling Alive" (Gomo) - 3:52
"I Wonder" (Gomo) - 5:03
"Santa's Depression" (Gomo) - 3:47
"Army Slave" (Gomo) - 4:01
"Proud to Be Blad" (Gomo) - 3:14
"November 6th" (Gomo) - 4:30
"Can't Find You" (Gomo) - 4:09
"You Never Came" (Gomo) - 5:00
"Be Careful With The Train" (Gomo) - 4:29
"It's All Worth It" (Gomo) - 3:38
"Caught" (Gomo) - 4:20
"You Might Ask" (Gomo) - 4:03

Personnel 
Mário Barreiros – acoustic guitar, producer, mastering, drums, bass
Pedro Oliveira – vocals
Mario Santos – saxophone
Manuel Simões – guitar

References

2004 albums
Gomo (musician) albums